Lothar Meister (26 January 1931 - 31 January 2021) was a German cyclist who was active between 1949 and 1960. He won the UCI Motor-paced World Championships in 1958 and finished in third place the next year.

He should not be confused with another cyclist of the same name who was competing in the same period, in the same area in East Germany (although a few years older, he was known as Lothar Meister II to differentiate between the two).

References

1931 births
2021 deaths
German male cyclists
People from Wittenberg
Cyclists from Saxony-Anhalt
People from Bezirk Halle
East German male cyclists